The Glorious Flight: Across the Channel with Louis Blériot is a children's picture book by Alice Provensen and Martin Provensen.  Released by Viking Press, in 1983, it was the recipient of the Caldecott Medal for illustration in 1984.

References

American picture books
Caldecott Medal–winning works
Children's history books
Viking Press books
Aviation books
1983 children's books